Hazali Nasiron  is a Singaporean football defender who played for Singapore in the 1984 Asian Cup.

References
Stats

Singaporean footballers
Singapore international footballers
Living people
1984 AFC Asian Cup players
Southeast Asian Games silver medalists for Singapore
Southeast Asian Games medalists in football
Association football defenders
Year of birth missing (living people)
Competitors at the 1989 Southeast Asian Games